Adelino Trindade (born 2 June 1995), simply known as Adelino or Ady, is an East Timorese footballer who plays as a midfielder for Dili United and the Timor-Leste national team.

International career
Adelino made his senior international debut on 21 November 2010 in a friendly match against Indonesia, becoming the youngest player to make his debut for the Timor-Leste national team at 15 years 172 days.

International goals
Scores and results list Timor-Leste's goal tally first.

References

1995 births
Living people
People from Baucau District
Association football defenders
East Timorese footballers
Timor-Leste international footballers
A.D. Baucau players
Footballers at the 2014 Asian Games
Competitors at the 2017 Southeast Asian Games
Asian Games competitors for East Timor
Southeast Asian Games competitors for East Timor